The first part of the 1967 Australian referendum to change the Constitution was the Parliament question, which related to the relative number of members in each house of the Australian Parliament − the so-called "nexus". The 1967 Australian referendum called by the Holt Government on 27 May 1967 consisted of two parts, with the second question relating to Aboriginal Australians.

Section 24 of the Australian Constitution requires that the number of members in the House of Representatives be, as nearly as possible, twice the number of members in the Senate. The most important effect of the "nexus" in the Australian Constitution is to prevent the dilution of the collective voting power of the Senate, which represents the Australian states equally, in any joint sitting of both houses following a double dissolution election. The nexus ensures that Senators will always have about one-third of the votes in a joint sitting, and Members of the House of Representatives about two-thirds. The referendum question asked the public to vote on whether "the number of members of the House of Representatives may be increased without necessarily increasing the number of Senators". It was defeated, with 59.75% of voters voting "No" to this question.

Question

Results

See also
Referendums in Australia
Politics of Australia
History of Australia

References

Further reading
Austats Special Article on the History of Pensions and other Benefits in Australia
 Standing Committee on Legislative and Constitutional Affairs (1997) Constitutional Change: Select sources on Constitutional change in Australia 1901–1997 . Australian Government Printing Service, Canberra.
 Bennett, Scott (2003). Research Paper no. 11 2002–03: The Politics of Constitutional Amendment  Australian Department of the Parliamentary Library, Canberra.
 Australian Electoral Commission (2007) Referendum Dates and Results 1906 – Present AEC, Canberra.
 

Referendums
1967 referendums
Constitutional referendums in Australia